Thomas Douglas Homan is an American former police officer and government official who served during the Trump Administration as Acting Director of the U.S. Immigration and Customs Enforcement (ICE) from January 30, 2017 to June 29, 2018. Since his retirement from government, he has been a Fox News contributor.

Career
Homan was born in West Carthage, New York. He holds an associate degree in criminal justice from Jefferson Community College and a bachelor's degree from SUNY Polytechnic Institute. He was a police officer in West Carthage, New York before joining what was then called the Immigration and Naturalization Service in 1984. He was a Border Patrol agent, investigator, and supervisor before being appointed by President Barack Obama to Executive Associate Director of Immigration and Customs Enforcement in 2013. In 2015, Obama gave him a Presidential Rank Award as a Distinguished Executive. A Washington Post article at the time stated, "Thomas Homan deports people. And he's really good at it."

Director of ICE
On January 30, 2017, President Donald Trump demoted acting Immigration and Customs Enforcement director Daniel Ragsdale to deputy director, a position he already held, and appointed Homan as acting director.

In May 2017, Homan announced ICE had arrested 41,319 people between Inauguration Day and the end of April, a 38% increase from the same period the year before.

As ICE director, Homan said that undocumented immigrants "should be afraid." He has denied saying "aliens commit more crimes than US citizens".

On November 14, 2017, Trump nominated Homan for ICE Director.

In February 2018, Homan said that politicians who support sanctuary city policies should be charged with crimes.

On April 30, 2018, he announced that he would retire from his position as acting ICE Director effective June of the same year.

On June 5, 2018, Homan appeared for a discussion with the Policy Director of the Center for Immigration Studies,

In July 2019, Homan testified before the House Oversight Committee regarding the Trump administration's family separation policy.

On February 25, 2022, Homan was slated as a keynote speaker for the America First Political Action Conference in Orlando, but left before the conference began after he learned that the founder Nick Fuentes had praised Putin for the Invasion of Ukraine.

References

External links

ICE profile
 
Official website

Living people
People from Jefferson County, New York
SUNY Polytechnic Institute alumni
United States Border Patrol agents
U.S. Immigration and Customs Enforcement officials
Trump administration personnel
Year of birth missing (living people)